Nuchiyad  is a village in Kannur district in the Indian state of Kerala.

Demographics
As of 2011 Census, Nuchiyad village had population of 12,686, of which 6,250 are males and 6,436 are females. The sex ratio of Nuchiyad was 1,029 lower than state average of 1,084. Population of children in the age group 0-6 was 1,322 (10.4%) where 668 are males and 654 are females. Nuchiyad had an overall literacy of 94.1 where male literacy stands at 96.6% and female literacy was 91.7%.

Transportation
The national highway passes through Kannur town.  Mangalore and Mumbai can be accessed on the northern side and Cochin and Thiruvananthapuram can be accessed on the southern side.  The road to the east of Iritty connects to Mysore and Bangalore. 

Kerala Hill Highway (SH 59) passes through Nuchiyad village connects nearby towns like Ulikkal, Iritty and Payyavoor. 
The nearest railway station is Kannur on Mangalore-Palakkad line. There are airports at Mangalore and Calicut.

References

Villages near Iritty